= Loch Lomond Place =

Shopping centre in New Brunswick, Canada

- Location: Saint John, New Brunswick, Canada
- Coordinates: 45.2871°N 66.0291°W
- Address: 120 McDonald Street
- Opened: April 3, 1968
- Floor area: 219,797 square feet (20,419.8 m^{2})
- Floors: 1

Loch Lomond Place is a shopping centre located in Saint John, New Brunswick, Canada. Opened in 1967 as Loch Lomond Shopping Mall, it has a floor area of 219,797 square feet (20,419.8 m^{2}) and serves the east side of Saint John.

== Description ==
Construction took place during 1967, with an expected opening date set for March 20, 1968. Set to be the largest enclosed shopping area in the Maritimes at the time, it was built by Maron Properties Ltd., at a cost of CA$2 million. By early 1968, Loch Lomond Shopping Mall's opening date was pushed back to April 3, 1968. Loch Lomond Place experienced significant decline by the 2010s, with original anchor stores being converted into call centres.
